Adam Lee Phillips (born 15 January 1998) is an English professional footballer who plays for Barnsley, as a midfielder.

Playing career

Liverpool
Phillips joined the Liverpool Academy from the Blackburn Rovers Academy at the age of 11 in 2009, and would spend the next eight years with the club. At the age of 16 he appeared in a pre-season friendly with Brøndby IF under Brendan Rodgers in 2014, but later struggled with a recurrent back injury.

Norwich City
He was released in May 2017, and signed a two-year contract with EFL Championship club Norwich City two months later following a trial period. On 4 February 2019, Norwich City announced that Phillips contract had been cancelled by mutual consent.

Cambridge United (loan)
On 3 January 2018, he joined EFL League Two side Cambridge United on loan until the end of the 2017–18 season, a move which Norwich under-23 manager Matthew Gill described as "the next step on his path". He made his debut in the English Football League for the "Us" on 13 January, in "an uneventful goalless draw" with Mansfield Town at the Abbey Stadium. He featured in three further matches before dropping out of the first-team picture as manager Shaun Derry lost his job; however Gill stated that "a manager change is one of those real-life scenarios so I think what he's getting exposed to now is fantastic".

Hamilton Academical (loan)
He moved on loan to Hamilton Academical in July 2018. The loan was cancelled in August 2018, after Phillips had made two cup appearances.

Burnley
In August 2019, he joined Burnley on a one-year contract following a successful trial.

Morecambe (loan)
On 2 January 2020, Phillips joined Morecambe on loan until the end of the season, alongside fellow Burnley player Ryan Cooney. On 29 February, he received the first straight red card of his career after a late tackle on Crewe’s Perry Ng in the 94th minute.  He contributed with 4 goals and 3 assists in 11 League Two matches.

On 12 August 2020, Phillips rejoined Morecambe on loan until the end of the season.

Accrington Stanley (loan)
On 1 February 2021, Phillips joined League One side Accrington Stanley on loan for the remainder of the 2020-21 season.

Return to Morecambe (loan)
On 27 July 2021, Phillips went again to Morecambe on loan.

Barnsley
In September 2022, Phillips joined Barnsley on a three-year contract for an undisclosed fee
.

Career statistics

References

1998 births
Living people
People from Garstang
English footballers
England youth international footballers
Association football midfielders
Blackburn Rovers F.C. players
Liverpool F.C. players
Norwich City F.C. players
Cambridge United F.C. players
Hamilton Academical F.C. players
Burnley F.C. players
Morecambe F.C. players
Accrington Stanley F.C. players
English Football League players
Footballers from Lancashire